Cosmic Coaster is a steel junior roller coaster at Valleyfair.

The ride was originally known as Dragon Coaster when it was located at Dorney Park & Wildwater Kingdom in South Whitehall Township, Pennsylvania. It was built in 1986 and operated from 1992 through the 2010 season. After 2010, the Dragon Coaster was removed along with the other children's rides in near the former Laser site. Dragon Coaster was moved to Valleyfair where it has operated since 2011 as Cosmic Coaster.

Cosmic Coaster has a single train with four cars. Each car has two rows of two seats each for a total of 16 passengers.

See also
 2011 in amusement parks

References

External links
Official page

Roller coasters introduced in 1992
Roller coasters operated by Cedar Fair
Valleyfair
Peanuts in amusement parks
Roller coasters in Pennsylvania